Leon Harry Leuty (23 October 1920 – 15 December 1955) was an English professional footballer who played as a central defender.

Career
Born in Meole Brace, Leuty played non-league football for Rolls Royce, before spending nine seasons in the Football League with Derby County, Bradford Park Avenue and Notts County. He played for  Derby County in the 1946 FA Cup Final, and captained the England B team on two occasions.

Leuty died of leukemia on 15 December 1955, while still club captain of Notts County.

References

1920 births
1955 deaths
English footballers
Rolls Royce Leisure F.C. players
Derby County F.C. players
Bradford (Park Avenue) A.F.C. players
Notts County F.C. players
English Football League players
Deaths from leukemia
Deaths from cancer in England
England B international footballers
English Football League representative players
Association football central defenders
Sportspeople from Shrewsbury
FA Cup Final players